The Edward Dodge House is a historic house at 70 Sparks Street in Cambridge, Massachusetts.  The -story wood-frame house was built in 1878 to a design by Longfellow and Clark.  It has asymmetrical massing typical of Queen Anne styling, and also has a style of half-timbering on its upper levels that was popular in England in the 1860s.  The exterior surfaces have a variety of textures, create by different sheathing types, including vertical boards, wood paneling, and brick patternwork.

The house was listed on the National Register of Historic Places in 1982.

See also
National Register of Historic Places listings in Cambridge, Massachusetts

References

Houses completed in 1878
Houses on the National Register of Historic Places in Cambridge, Massachusetts
Queen Anne architecture in Massachusetts